Every Dog's Guide to Complete Home Safety is a Canadian animated short film, directed by Les Drew for the National Film Board of Canada and released in 1986. The film's central character is Wally (Paul Brown), a dog who is frantically trying to protect his new family from their own careless actions as they prepare for a dinner party.

The film's voice cast also includes Luba Goy as Honey, Harvey Atkin as Bernard and Henry Beckman as The Boss.

It received a Genie Award nomination for Best Animated Short Film at the 8th Genie Awards in 1987.

Drew released a sequel film, Every Dog's Guide to the Playground, in 1991. Both films were broadcast in the United States on Cartoon Network's O Canada anthology series of NFB animated shorts, and were packaged together in 1996 for home video release as The Blue Dog Safety Video.

References

External links
 

1986 films
1986 animated films
Canadian animated short films
National Film Board of Canada animated short films
Animated films about dogs
1980s English-language films
1980s Canadian films